Thomas Keith may refer to:
Thomas Keith (film director), American filmmaker, educator and anti-sexist activist
Thomas Keith (politician) (1863–1916), British Columbian politician
Thomas Keith (surgeon) (1827–1895), Scottish surgeon and amateur photographer
Thomas Keith (soldier) (died 1815), Scottish soldier who converted to Islam
Tom Keith (1946–2011), American radio personality